Johannes Everding (17 October 1876, Gelsenkirchen – 13 December 1914, Kassel) was a German sculptor and medallist, primarily known for monuments and fountains.

Life and work 
His father, Dr. Friedrich Wilhelm Hermann Everding (1824–1880) was a general practitioner. His mother, Ella née Müldner (1854–1951), was a meat inspector. After graduating from the Friedrichsgymnasium Kassel, he attended the Kunsthochschule Kassel, where he studied with the sculptor, Karl Begas. 

In 1898, he was awarded a small gold medal at the Große Berliner Kunstausstellung. The following year, he was presented with the Großen Staatspreis from the Prussian Academy of Arts. This award included an extensive study trip through Italy, and a stay at the Villa Strohl Fern from 1900 to 1901. He remained in Rome until 1902, when he was said to have been chosen to carry out the construction of a monument to Empress Victoria at the Siegesallee. The commission went to Fritz Gerth instead. Later that year, he returned to Kassel to marry  Marie le Noir (1877–1918). They would have one daughter in 1912. 

In 1910, the Accademia di San Luca in Rome awarded him their Müllerpreis. He died in Kassel four years later, at the age of thirty-eight, in the presence of a friend. The cause of death was apparently not recorded.

His best known sculptures include monuments to August Kekulé (Bonn) and Philip I, Landgrave of Hesse (Kassel), as well as smaller works, such as the herms of Goethe and Schiller at the Staatstheater Kassel.

References

Further reading 
 "Everding, Hans", In: Allgemeines Lexikon der Bildenden Künstler von der Antike bis zur Gegenwart, Vol. 11: Erman–Fiorenzo, E. A. Seemann, Leipzig 1915 (Online)
 "Everding, Hans". In: Hans Vollmer (Ed.): Allgemeines Lexikon der bildenden Künstler des XX. Jahrhunderts, Vol.5: V–Z. E. A. Seemann, Leipzig 1961, pg.466

External links 

 
 Hans Everding @ the Deutsche Gesellschaft für Medaillenkunst

1876 births
1914 deaths
German sculptors
People from Gelsenkirchen